In 2006, Johnny and the Moon released its debut self-titled LP on British Columbia, Canada-based record company Kill Devil Hills. The album features Dante DeCaro on lead vocals, guitar, and banjo; Lindy Gerrard on drums; and Mark Devoe on bass and keyboard.

Track listing 
 "Green Rocky Road" - 3:20
 "Kid Heaven" - 2:34
  "The Ballad of Scarlet Town" - 3:15
  "Johnny and the Devil" - 4:20
  "When You're All Alone" - 2:39
  "All Things Gonna Come Back Around" - 3:24
  "Little Red Cat" - 3:01
  "Oleanna" - 2:49
  "Scarlet Town, Pt. II" - 2:46
  "Tamed a Lion" - 2:11
  "When I Die" - 4:11

External links
 Pitchfork Media review found HERE

References

2006 debut albums
Johnny and the Moon albums